Sassen could refer to:

 Maan Sassen, Dutch politician
 Saskia Sassen, Dutch-American sociologist and economist
 Willem Sassen, Dutch Nazi collaborator and journalist who interviewed Adolf Eichmann
 Sassen, Germany, municipality in Rhineland-Palatinate, Germany
 German name for Sasna, territory in Old Prussia